Florencia Hunt (born 14 May 1978) is a Dutch Antillean middle-distance runner. She competed in the women's 800 metres at the 2000 Summer Olympics. She later became a bodybuilder.

References

External links
 

1978 births
Living people
Athletes (track and field) at the 2000 Summer Olympics
Dutch Antillean female middle-distance runners
Olympic athletes of the Netherlands Antilles
Place of birth missing (living people)